Salix lucida, the shining willow, Pacific willow, red willow, or whiplash willow, is a species of willow native to northern and western North America, occurring in wetland habitats. It is the largest willow found in British Columbia.

The shoots are greenish-brown to grey-brown.

The subspecies are:
S. l. lucidashining willow, Newfoundland west to eastern Saskatchewan, and south to Maryland and South Dakota
S. l. lasiandra (Benth.) E.Murray (syn. S. lasiandra Benth.)Pacific willow, Alaska east to Northwest Territory, and south to California and New Mexico.
S. l. caudata (Nutt.) E.Murraywhiplash willow, interior western North America from eastern British Columbia south to eastern California and Nevada, included in S. l. lasiandra by some authors.

It is closely related to Salix pentandra of Europe and Asia.

References

External links
 
 
 
 
 
 

lucida
Flora of California
Flora of the Western United States
Natural history of the California chaparral and woodlands
Flora of the California desert regions
Flora of the Cascade Range
Flora of the Great Basin
Flora of the Klamath Mountains
Flora of the Sierra Nevada (United States)
Natural history of the California Coast Ranges
Natural history of the Central Valley (California)
Natural history of the Channel Islands of California
Natural history of the Colorado Desert
Natural history of the Mojave Desert
Natural history of the Peninsular Ranges
Natural history of the San Francisco Bay Area
Natural history of the Santa Monica Mountains
Natural history of the Transverse Ranges
Taxa named by Gotthilf Heinrich Ernst Muhlenberg
Flora without expected TNC conservation status